Wisconsin's 3rd congressional district covers most of the Driftless Area in southwestern and western Wisconsin. The district includes the cities of Eau Claire, La Crosse,  and Stevens Point, as well as many Wisconsin-based exurbs of the Minneapolis-St. Paul metropolitan area. It borders the states of Minnesota, Iowa, and Illinois. Republican Derrick Van Orden has represented the district since 2023.

The political nature of the district is moderate, given its combination of an overall rural and suburban character counterbalanced by two significant urban centers (Eau Claire and La Crosse) and the Twin Cities suburbs. It historically elected moderate Republicans; before Kind's 1996 victory, only two Democrats represented it in the 20th century. Al Gore, John Kerry, and Barack Obama all carried the district at the presidential level; it then narrowly voted for Donald Trump in 2016 and again in 2020 with slightly increased margins, as a result, the Cook Partisan Voting Index adjusted the district's partisan lean in 2021 from "even" to R+4.

Counties and municipalities within the district

Adams County
 Adams, Arkdale, Dellwood, Friendship, Grand Marsh, Lake Arrowhead, Lake Camelot, Lake Sherwood, and Wisconsin Dells (Adams County section).

Buffalo County
 Alma, Buffalo City, Cochrane, Fountain City, Mondovi, and Nelson.

Chippewa County
 Chippewa Falls and Lake Hallie.

Crawford County
 Bell Center, Eastman, Ferryville, Gays Mills, Lynxville, Mount Sterling, Prairie du Chien, Soldiers Grove, Steuben, and Wauzeka.

Dunn County
 Boyceville, Colfax, Downing, Elk Mound, Knapp, Menomonie, Ridgeland, and Wheeler.

Eau Claire County
 Altoona, Augusta, Eau Claire, Fairchild, and Fall Creek.

Grant County
 Bagley, Boscobel, Bloomington, Blue River, Cassville, Cuba City, Dickeyville, Fennimore, Hazel Green, Lancaster, Livingston, Montfort, Muscoda, Platteville, Potosi, and Tennyson.

Jackson County
 Alma Center, Black River Falls, Hixton, Melrose, and Taylor.

Juneau County
 Camp Douglas, Elroy, Hustler, Lyndon Station, Mauston, Union Center, and Wonewoc.

La Crosse County
 Bangor, Campbell, La Crosse, Holmen, Rockland, Onalaska, and West Salem.

Monroe County
 Cashton, Kendall, Melvina, Norwalk, Oakdale, Sparta, Tomah, and Wilton.

Pepin County
 Durand, Pepin, and Stockholm.

Pierce County
 Bay City, Ellsworth, Maiden Rock, Plum City, Prescott, River Falls (Pierce County side), Spring Valley (Pierce County side).

Portage County
 Almond, Amherst, Amherst Junction, Junction City, Nelsonville, Park Ridge, Plover, and Whiting.

Richland County
 Boaz, Cazenovia, Lone Rock, Richland Center, Viola, and Yuba.

Trempealeau County
 Arcadia, Blair, Eleva, Ettrick, Galesville, Independence, Pigeon Falls, Osseo, Strum, Trempealeau, and Whitehall.

Vernon County
 Chaseburg, Coon Valley, De Soto, Genoa, Hillsboro, La Farge, Ontario, Readstown, Stoddard, Viroqua, and Westby.

Wood County
 Biron, Milladore, Nekoosa, Port Edwards, Rudolph, and Vesper.

List of members representing the district

Recent election results

2002 district boundaries (2002–2011)

2011 district boundaries (2012–2021)

Election results from presidential races

See also

Wisconsin's congressional districts
List of United States congressional districts

References

 Congressional Biographical Directory of the United States 1774–present

External links 
Wisconsin's 3rd Congressional District

03